The Cake Eaters is a 2007 American independent drama film about two small town families who must confront old issues with the return of one family's son. The film was directed by Mary Stuart Masterson (in her feature film directorial debut) and stars Kristen Stewart, Aaron Stanford, Bruce Dern, and Jayce Bartok. Kristen Stewart is featured as Georgia, a young girl with Friedreich's ataxia, a rare disease for which there is no cure.

Plot

The Cake Eaters is a small-town, ensemble drama that explores the lives of two interconnected families coming to terms with love in the face of loss. Living in rural America, the Kimbrough family are a conflicted bunch: Easy, the patriarch and local butcher, is grieving over the recent loss of his wife, Ceci, while hiding a secret ongoing affair for years; Beagle, his youngest son who was left to care for his ailing mother, works in the local high school cafeteria by day but has a burning passion inside that manifests itself through painting street signs; and the eldest son, Guy, has been away from the family for years while pursuing his rock star dream in the big city until the day he learns of his mother's death and that he has missed the funeral.

Upon Guy's return home, relationships between the characters begin to unravel: Beagle's pent up emotions connect with Georgia Kaminski, a terminally ill teenage girl wanting to experience love before it is too late; Easy's long-time affair with Marg, Georgia's eccentric grandmother, is finally exposed to the Kimbrough children; and Guy discovers that in his absence his high school sweetheart, Stephanie, has moved on and started a family of her own. Consequently, The Kimbroughs and Kaminskis manage to establish new beginnings in facing their varied relationships.

Cast
Kristen Stewart as Georgia Kaminski
Aaron Stanford as Beagle
Bruce Dern as Easy Kimbrough
Elizabeth Ashley as Marg
Jayce Bartok as Guy
Miriam Shor as Stephanie
Talia Balsam as Violet, Georgia's mother
Jesse L. Martin as Judd, Violet's boyfriend
Melissa Leo as Ceci

Meaning of title
In an interview at the Austin Film Festival in 2007, Jayce Bartok, the movie's screenwriter, was asked about the title's meaning. Bartok is quoted as saying, "The Cake Eaters is a term I grew up with in Pennsylvania. My mom used to use it to describe those who had it made, had their lives mapped out for them, were the most likely to succeed… 'The Cake Eaters.' I thought it was an interesting metaphor for this group of misfits who begin the story searching and longing for love, trying to overcome grief, and through the course of the story… find their 'cake.' They find some love, happiness, peace…." The term was widely popularized as a quote from the 1992 film The Mighty Ducks.

Release
The Cake Eaters opened at the Tribeca Film Festival on April 29, 2007, and made the rounds of the independent film circuit, premiering at various film festivals such as the Woodstock Film Festival, Lone Star International Film Festival, Fort Lauderdale International Film Festival. It was eventually given a limited theatrical release on March 13, 2009, and debuted on DVD on March 24, 2009.

Critical reception
The Cake Eaters holds a "fresh" rating of 64% at Rotten Tomatoes based on 25 reviews with an average rating of 6.01/10. The site’s critics consensus reads, "Though light on theme and craftsmanship, The Cake Eaters relies on fine performances and brisk direction to provide an affecting tale of small-town life."

Roger Ebert of the Chicago Sun-Times, who gave it three out of four stars, praised Masterson for a good debut. Stephen Holden of The New York Times called it a "small, overcrowded ensemble piece" that is "elevated" by "superior acting" into "something deeper". Other critics, such as Rex Reed of the New York Observer, Bill Goodykoontz of the Arizona Republic, and V.A. Musetto of the New York Post, also gave favorable reviews, with Musetto, in particular, lamenting the fact that it had taken two years for the film to be released theatrically.

Not all reception was positive however, with Erin Trahan of the Boston Globe, Gary Goldstein of the Los Angeles Times, and Aaron Hillis of Village Voice, among others, giving it negative reviews. Goldstein, in particular, was sharply critical of what he described as "a bland ensemble drama with an unremarkable script."

Awards
People's Choice Award for Best American Indie Film - 2007 Ft. Lauderdale International Film Festival
Audience Award for a Dramatic Feature - 2008 Ashland Independent Film Festival
Discovery Award - 2008 Sedona International Film Festival
Best Feature - 2008 Stony Brook Film Festival

References

External links
 
 

2007 films
2007 independent films
2007 drama films
American drama films
Films about disability
Films directed by Mary Stuart Masterson
Films about families
2007 directorial debut films
2000s English-language films
2000s American films